The Dr. Samuel MacKenzie Elliott House is a historic house located at 69 Delafield Place in West New Brighton, Staten Island, New York.

Description and history 
Built in 1840, it was one of 22 similar houses in the area designed and built as investments by Scottish born Samuel Mackenzie Elliott, an oculist and eye surgeon who boasted prominent clients like John Jacob Astor, Peter Cooper, Henry Wadsworth Longfellow, and Horace Greeley. So great was his influence on the first settlement of this part of the north shore of Staten Island that the neighborhood was then known as "Elliotville". It is a -story, dark grey, locally quarried stone cottage in the Gothic style cottage. It has a gable roof with a small, pointed arch window under the rear gable.

Elliot was an active abolitionist, and this house, along with his own, was reputedly outfitted as a refuge for slaves escaping the United States via the Underground Railroad.

It was designated a New York City Landmark in 1967, and it was added to the National Register of Historic Places on March 28, 1980.

See also
List of New York City Designated Landmarks in Staten Island
National Register of Historic Places listings in Richmond County, New York

References

External links
 2007 photo, with transcribed description from NRHC nomination

Houses on the National Register of Historic Places in Staten Island
Gothic Revival architecture in New York (state)
Houses completed in 1840
New York City Designated Landmarks in Staten Island
Underground Railroad in New York (state)
African-American history in New York City
West New Brighton, Staten Island